Jarosław Studzizba (born 28 October 1955) is a former Polish footballer who played as a midfielder. He played in the top national leagues in Poland, Germany, Austria and Belgium.

Biography

Born in Nysa, Studzizba began playing football with his local team Polonia Nysa. In 1973 he joined Odra Opole, making his debut in the I liga, Poland's top division. After Odra were relegated at the end of the season he joined Górnik Zabrze. He made his Górnik debut on 28 September 1978, playing in the defeat against Gwardia Warsaw. He made 33 league appearances while at Górnik, also appearing in the UEFA Cup. Afterwards he had spells with Polonia Bytom and Polonia Warsaw, before finding himself at Lechia Gdańsk. He made his Lechia debut on 18 March 1979, playing 13 times in the league for Lechia that season. Over the span of two and a half seasons Studzizba made 53 league appearances and scored 10 goals for Lechia.

Studzizba and his family then moved to Germany, staying with his wife's family. While in Germany he played with Eintracht Braunschweig, playing in the Bundesliga for the club. He made 51 appearances and scored 9 goals in the German top division. He next move was to Austria, playing with Austria Salzburg. In his first season he made 27 appearances in the Austrian first division, playing in the second tier with the club after they suffered relegation. After his two seasons in Austria he moved to Belgium, firstly playing with KFC Winterslag, the team that would later become Genk. Spells with KSC Hasselt, FC Neeroeteren and KVK Wellen followed, with Studzizba retiring from playing in 1994.

References

1955 births
Living people
Polish footballers
Odra Opole players
Górnik Zabrze players
Polonia Bytom players
Polonia Warsaw players
Lechia Gdańsk players
Eintracht Braunschweig players
K.R.C. Genk players
Association football midfielders
Polish expatriate footballers
Expatriate footballers in Germany
Polish expatriate sportspeople in Germany
Expatriate footballers in Austria
Polish expatriate sportspeople in Austria
Expatriate footballers in Belgium
Polish expatriate sportspeople in Belgium